Elachista iriphaea is a moth of the family Elachistidae. It is found in Uganda.

References

Endemic fauna of Uganda
iriphaea
Moths described in 1932
Insects of Uganda
Moths of Africa